The Battle of Clarines was a battle in the Venezuelan War of Independence. Royalist forces attacked a north-bound force from the Third Republic of Venezuela near the town of Clarines. The outnumbered and poorly armed Royalists secured a victory against the Patriot rebels.

Background
After arriving from Port-au-Prince, revolutionaries Simón Bolívar and Juan Bautista Arismendi gathered a force of 700 soldiers at Margarita Island for a new campaign to take the city of Caracas.

Battle
On 9 January 1817, 10 days after Bolívar's and Arismendi's arrival in mainland Venezuela, the force, which had been bolstered with 900 more soldiers, was on the way to Puerto Píritu. It was there that they were attacked by a force from an entrenched Royalist position near the Unare River. The group had around 890 soldiers, including 330 native archers and 10 horsemen. During the course of battle, a native force, led by the Chief of Clarines, travelled from the south and surprised the Patriot forces. This outflanking caused the Patriot forces to be massacred. Many survivors were driven into the forest, where they drowned or were later captured and executed. In all, around 900 Patriot forces were killed.

The battle was a major loss for the Patriot forces. Few survived the battle, including Bolívar, Arismendi, and five more officers.

Aftermath

References

Battles of the Venezuelan War of Independence
Conflicts in 1817
1817 in Venezuela